Musul may stand for:

 The city of Mosul, Iraq
 An alternate name for Wushu, a Chinese martial art
 Korean martial arts